

Events

Pre-1600
 598 – Goguryeo-Sui War: In response to a Goguryeo (Korean) incursion into Liaoxi, Emperor Wéndi of Sui orders his youngest son, Yang Liang (assisted by the co-prime minister Gao Jiong), to conquer Goguryeo during the Manchurian rainy season, with a Chinese army and navy. 
1265 – Second Barons' War: Battle of Evesham: The army of Prince Edward (the future king Edward I of England) defeats the forces of rebellious barons led by Simon de Montfort, 6th Earl of Leicester, killing de Montfort and many of his allies.
1327 – First War of Scottish Independence: James Douglas leads a raid into Weardale and almost kills Edward III of England.
1578 – Battle of Al Kasr al Kebir: The Moroccans defeat the Portuguese. King Sebastian of Portugal is killed in the battle, leaving his elderly uncle, Cardinal Henry, as his heir. This initiates a succession crisis in Portugal.

1601–1900
1693 – Date traditionally ascribed to Dom Perignon's invention of champagne; it is not clear whether he actually invented champagne, however he has been credited as an innovator who developed the techniques used to perfect sparkling wine.
1701 – Great Peace of Montreal between New France and First Nations is signed.
1704 – War of the Spanish Succession: Gibraltar is captured by an English and Dutch fleet, commanded by Admiral Sir George Rooke and allied with Archduke Charles.
1783 – Mount Asama erupts in Japan, killing about 1,400 people (Tenmei eruption). The eruption causes a famine, which results in an additional 20,000 deaths.
1789 – France: abolition of feudalism by the National Constituent Assembly.
1790 – A newly passed tariff act creates the Revenue Cutter Service (the forerunner of the United States Coast Guard).
1791 – The Treaty of Sistova is signed, ending the Ottoman–Habsburg wars.
1796 – French Revolutionary Wars: Napoleon leads the French Army of Italy to victory in the Battle of Lonato.
1821 – The Saturday Evening Post is published for the first time as a weekly newspaper.
1854 – The Hinomaru is established as the official flag to be flown from Japanese ships.
1863 – Matica slovenská, Slovakia's public-law cultural and scientific institution focusing on topics around the Slovak nation, is established in Martin.
1873 – American Indian Wars: While protecting a railroad survey party in Montana, the United States 7th Cavalry, under Lieutenant Colonel George Armstrong Custer clashes for the first time with the Cheyenne and Lakota people near the Tongue River; only one man on each side is killed.
1889 – The Great Fire of Spokane, Washington destroys some 32 blocks of the city, prompting a mass rebuilding project.
1892 – The father and stepmother of Lizzie Borden are found murdered in their Fall River, Massachusetts home. She will be tried and acquitted for the crimes a year later.

1901–present
1914 – World War I: In response to the German invasion of Belgium, Belgium and the British Empire declare war on Germany. The United States declares its neutrality.
1915 – World War I: The German 12th Army occupies Warsaw during the Gorlice–Tarnów Offensive and the Great Retreat of 1915.
1921 – Bolshevik–Makhnovist conflict: Mikhail Frunze declares victory over the Makhnovshchina.
1924 – Diplomatic relations between Mexico and the Soviet Union are established.
1936 – Prime Minister of Greece Ioannis Metaxas suspends parliament and the Constitution and establishes the 4th of August Regime.
1944 – The Holocaust: A tip from a Dutch informer leads the Gestapo to a sealed-off area in an Amsterdam warehouse, where they find and arrest Jewish diarist Anne Frank, her family, and four others.
  1944   – The Finnish Parliament, by derogation, elected Marshal C. G. E. Mannerheim as President of Finland to replace Risto Ryti, who had resigned.
1946 – An earthquake of magnitude 8.0 hits northern Dominican Republic. One hundred are killed and 20,000 are left homeless.
1947 – The Supreme Court of Japan is established.
1964 – Civil rights movement: Civil rights workers Michael Schwerner, Andrew Goodman and James Chaney are found dead in Mississippi after disappearing on June 21.
  1964   – Second Gulf of Tonkin Incident: U.S. destroyers  and  mistakenly report coming under attack in the Gulf of Tonkin.
1965 – The Constitution of the Cook Islands comes into force, giving the Cook Islands self-governing status within New Zealand.
1969 – Vietnam War: At the apartment of French intermediary Jean Sainteny in Paris, American representative Henry Kissinger and North Vietnamese representative Xuân Thuỷ begin secret peace negotiations. The negotiations will eventually fail.
1972 – Ugandan President Idi Amin announces that Uganda is no longer responsible for the care of British subjects of Asian origin, beginning the expulsions of Ugandan Asians.
1974 – A bomb explodes in the Italicus Express train at San Benedetto Val di Sambro, Italy, killing 12 people and wounding 22.
1975 – The Japanese Red Army takes more than 50 hostages at the AIA Building housing several embassies in Kuala Lumpur, Malaysia. The hostages include the U.S. consul and the Swedish Chargé d'affaires. The gunmen win the release of five imprisoned comrades and fly with them to Libya.
1977 – U.S. President Jimmy Carter signs legislation creating the United States Department of Energy.
1983 – Jean-Baptiste Ouédraogo, president of the military government of Upper Volta, is ousted from power in a coup d'état led by Captain Thomas Sankara.
1984 – The Republic of Upper Volta changes its name to Burkina Faso.
1987 – The Federal Communications Commission rescinds the Fairness Doctrine which had required radio and television stations to present controversial issues "fairly".
1995 – Operation Storm begins in Croatia.
2006 – A massacre is carried out by Sri Lankan government forces, killing 17 employees of the French INGO Action Against Hunger (known internationally as Action Contre la Faim, or ACF).
2007 – NASA's Phoenix spacecraft is launched.
2018 – Syrian civil war: The Syrian Democratic Forces (SDF) expel the Islamic State of Iraq and the Levant (ISIL) from the Iraq–Syria border, concluding the second phase of the Deir ez-Zor campaign.
2019 – Nine people are killed and 26 injured in a shooting in Dayton, Ohio. This comes only 12 hours after another mass shooting in El Paso, Texas, where 23 people were killed.
2020 – At least 220 people are killed and over 5,000 are wounded when 2,700 tons of ammonium nitrate explodes in Beirut, Lebanon.

Births

Pre-1600
1222 – Richard de Clare, 6th Earl of Gloucester, English soldier (d. 1262)
1281 – Külüg Khan, Emperor Wuzong of Yuan (d. 1311)
1290 – Leopold I, Duke of Austria (d. 1326)
1463 – Lorenzo di Pierfrancesco de' Medici, Florentine patron of the arts (d. 1503)
1469 – Margaret of Saxony, Duchess of Brunswick-Lüneburg (d. 1528)
1470 – Bernardo Dovizi, Italian cardinal (d. 1520)
1470 – Lucrezia de' Medici, Italian noblewoman (d. 1553)
1521 – Pope Urban VII (d. 1590)
1522 – Udai Singh II, King of Mewar (d. 1572)

1601–1900
1604 – François Hédelin, abbé d'Aubignac, French cleric and author (d. 1676)
1623 – Friedrich Casimir, Count of Hanau-Lichtenberg (1641–1680) and Hanau-Münzenberg (1642–1680) (d. 1685)
1701 – Thomas Blackwell, Scottish historian and scholar (d. 1757)
1704 – Louis d'Orléans, Duke of Orléans (d. 1752)
1719 – Johann Gottlob Lehmann, German mineralogist and geologist (d. 1767)
1721 – Granville Leveson-Gower, 1st Marquess of Stafford, English politician, Lord President of the Council (d. 1803)
1755 – Nicolas-Jacques Conté, French soldier, painter, balloonist, and inventor (d. 1805)
1792 – Percy Bysshe Shelley, English poet and playwright (d. 1822)
1805 – William Rowan Hamilton, Irish physicist, astronomer, and mathematician (d. 1865)
1821 – Louis Vuitton, French fashion designer, founded Louis Vuitton (d. 1892)
1821 – James Springer White, American religious leader, co-founded the Seventh-day Adventist Church (d. 1881)
1834 – John Venn, English mathematician and philosopher (d. 1923)
1836 – Jens Vilhelm Dahlerup, Danish architect (d. 1907)
1839 – Walter Pater, English author, critic, and academic (d. 1894)
1844 – Henri Berger, German composer and bandleader (d. 1929)
1853 – John Henry Twachtman, American painter, etcher, and academic (d. 1902)
1859 – Knut Hamsun, Norwegian novelist, poet, and playwright, Nobel Prize laureate (d. 1952)
1861 – Daniel Edward Howard, 16th president of Liberia (d. 1935)
1867 – Jake Beckley, American baseball player and coach (d. 1918)
1868 – Master C. V. V., Indian philosopher, yogi and guru (d. 1922)
1870 – Harry Lauder, Scottish actor and singer (d. 1950)
1871 – William Holman, English-Australian politician, 19th Premier of New South Wales (d. 1934)
1876 – Giovanni Giuriati, Italian lawyer and politician (d. 1970)
1876 – John Scaddan, Australian politician, 10th Premier of Western Australia (d. 1934)
1884 – Béla Balázs, Hungarian poet and critic (d. 1949)
1884 – Henri Cornet, French cyclist (d. 1941)
1887 – Albert M. Greenfield, Ukrainian-American businessman and philanthropist (d. 1967)
1888 – Taher Saifuddin, Indian religious leader, 51st Da'i al-Mutlaq (d. 1965)
1890 – Dolf Luque, Cuban baseball player and manager (d. 1957)
1893 – Fritz Gause, German historian and curator (d. 1973)
1898 – Ernesto Maserati, Italian race car driver and engineer (d. 1975)
1899 – Ezra Taft Benson, American religious leader, 13th President of The Church of Jesus Christ of Latter-day Saints (d. 1994)
1900 – Queen Elizabeth The Queen Mother of the United Kingdom (d. 2002)

1901–present
1901 – Louis Armstrong, American trumpet player and singer (d. 1971)
  1901   – Clarence Passailaigue, Jamaican cricketer (d. 1972)
1902 – Bill Hallahan, American baseball player (d. 1981)
1904 – Witold Gombrowicz, Polish author and playwright (d. 1969)
  1904   – Helen Kane, American singer and actress (d. 1966)
  1904   – Joe Tate, English footballer and manager (d. 1973)
1905 – Abeid Karume, 1st President of Zanzibar (d. 1972)
1906 – Eugen Schuhmacher, German zoologist, director, and producer (d. 1973)
1908 – Kurt Eichhorn, German conductor (d. 1994)
1909 – Glenn Cunningham, American runner and academic (d. 1988)
1910 – Anita Page, American actress (d. 2008)
  1910   – William Schuman, American composer and educator (d. 1992)
  1910   – Hedda Sterne, Romanian-American painter and photographer (d. 2011)
1912 – Aleksandr Danilovich Aleksandrov, Russian mathematician, physicist, and mountaineer (d. 1999)
  1912   – David Raksin, American composer and educator (d. 2004)
  1912   – Raoul Wallenberg, Swedish architect and diplomat (d. 1947)
1913 – Wesley Addy, American actor (d. 1996)
  1913   – Robert Hayden, American poet and educator (d. 1980)
  1913   – Johann Niemann, German lieutenant (d. 1943)
1915 – Warren Avis, American businessman, founded Avis Rent a Car System (d. 2007)
1917 – John Fitch, American race car driver and engineer (d. 2012)
1918 – Brian Crozier, Australian-English historian and journalist (d. 2012)
1919 – Michel Déon, French novelist, playwright, and critic (d. 2016)
1920 – Helen Thomas, American journalist and author (d. 2013)
1921 – Herb Ellis, American guitarist (d. 2010)
  1921   – Maurice Richard, Canadian ice hockey player and coach (d. 2000)
1922 – Mayme Agnew Clayton, American librarian (d.2006)
  1922   – Luis Aponte Martínez, Puerto Rican cardinal (d. 2012)
1926 – George Irving Bell, American physicist, biologist, and mountaineer (d. 2000)
  1926   – Perry Moss, American football player and coach (d. 2014)
1928 – Christian Goethals, Belgian race car driver (d. 2003)
  1928   – Gerard Damiano, American director, producer, and screenwriter (d. 2008)
1928 – Nadežka Mosusova, Serbian composer
1929 – Kishore Kumar, Indian singer-songwriter and actor (d. 1987)
  1929   – Vellore G. Ramabhadran, Mridangam artiste from Tamil Nadu, India (d. 2012)
1930 – Ali al-Sistani, Iranian-Iraqi cleric and scholar
1931 – Naren Tamhane, Indian cricketer (d. 2002)
1932 – Frances E. Allen, American computer scientist and academic (d. 2020)
  1932   – Liang Congjie, Chinese environmentalist, founded Friends of Nature (d. 2010)
1934 – Dallas Green, American baseball player and manager (d. 2017)
1935 – Carol Arthur, American actress and producer (d. 2020)
  1935   – Hans-Walter Eigenbrodt, German footballer and coach (d. 1997)
  1935   – Michael J. Noonan, Irish farmer and politician, 25th Minister of Defence for Ireland (d. 2013)
1936 – Giorgos Zographos, Greek singer and actor (d. 2005)
1937 – David Bedford, English keyboard player, composer, and conductor (d. 2011)
1938 – Ellen Schrecker, American historian and academic
1939 – Jack Cunningham, Baron Cunningham of Felling, English politician, Minister for the Cabinet Office
  1939   – Frankie Ford, American R&B/rock and roll singer (d. 2015)
1940 – Coriún Aharonián, Uruguayan composer and musicologist (d. 2017)
  1940   – Robin Harper, Scottish academic and politician
  1940   – Larry Knechtel, American bass player and pianist (d. 2009)
  1940   – Frances Stewart, English economist and academic
  1940   – Timi Yuro, American singer-songwriter (d. 2004)
1941 – Martin Jarvis, English actor
  1941   – Andy Smillie, English footballer
  1941   – Ted Strickland, American psychologist and politician, 68th Governor of Ohio
1942 – Don S. Davis, American actor (d. 2008)
  1942   – Cleon Jones, American baseball player
  1942   – David Lange, New Zealand lawyer and politician, 32nd Prime Minister of New Zealand (d. 2005)
1943 – Vicente Álvarez Areces, Spanish politician, 6th President of the Principality of Asturias (d. 2019)
  1943   – Barbara Saß-Viehweger, German politician, lawyer and civil law notary
  1943   – Bjørn Wirkola, Norwegian ski jumper and footballer
1944 – Richard Belzer, American actor (d. 2023)
  1944   – Doudou Ndoye, Senegalese lawyer and politician
1945 – Paul McCarthy, American painter and sculptor
  1945   – Alan Mulally, American engineer and businessman
1946 – Aleksei Turovski, Estonian zoologist and ethologist
1947 – Klaus Schulze, German keyboard player and songwriter (d. 2022) 
1948 – Johnny Grubb, American baseball player and coach
1949 – John Riggins, American football player, sportscaster, and actor
1950 – Caldwell Jones, American basketball player and coach (d. 2014)
  1950   – N. Rangaswamy, Indian lawyer and politician, 9th Chief Minister of Puducherry
1951 – Peter Goodfellow, English geneticist and academic
1952 – James Arbuthnot, English lawyer and politician, Secretary of State for Business, Innovation and Skills
  1952   – Moya Brennan, Irish singer-songwriter and harp player 
  1952   – Gábor Demszky, Hungarian sociologist, lawyer, and politician
1953 – Hiroyuki Usui, Japanese footballer and manager
1954 – Anatoliy Kinakh, Ukrainian engineer and politician, 11th Prime Minister of Ukraine
  1954   – Steve Phillips, English footballer
  1954   – François Valéry, Algerian-French singer-songwriter
1955 – Alberto Gonzales, American soldier, lawyer, and politician, 80th United States Attorney General
  1955   – Billy Bob Thornton, American actor, director, and screenwriter 
1957 – Rupert Farley, British actor and voice actor
  1957   – Brooks D. Simpson, American historian and author
  1957   – Valdis Valters, Latvian basketball player and coach
  1957   – John Wark, Scottish footballer and sportscaster
1958 – Allison Hedge Coke, American-Canadian poet and academic
  1958   – Mary Decker, American runner
  1958   – Silvan Shalom, Tunisian-Israeli sergeant and politician, 30th Deputy Prime Minister of Israel
1959 – Robbin Crosby, American guitarist and songwriter (d. 2002)
  1959   – John Gormley, Irish politician, Minister for the Environment, Community and Local Government
1960 – Chuck C. Lopez, American jockey
  1960   – José Luis Rodríguez Zapatero, Spanish academic and politician, 5th Prime Minister of Spain
  1960   – Bernard Rose, English director, screenwriter, and cinematographer
  1960   – Tim Winton, Australian author and playwright
1961 – Barack Obama, American lawyer and politician, 44th President of the United States, Nobel Prize laureate
1962 – Roger Clemens, American baseball player and actor
  1962   – Paul Reynolds, English singer-songwriter and guitarist
1963 – Keith Maurice Ellison, 30th Attorney General of Minnesota
1964 – Andrew Bartlett, Australian social worker and politician
1965 – Vishal Bhardwaj, Indian film director, screenwriter, producer, music composer and playback singer
  1965   – Adam Afriyie, English businessman and politician
  1965   – Dennis Lehane, American author, screenwriter, and producer
  1965   – Fredrik Reinfeldt, Swedish soldier and politician, 42nd Prime Minister of Sweden
  1965   – Michael Skibbe, German footballer and manager
1967 – Michael Marsh, American sprinter
1968 – Daniel Dae Kim, South Korean-American actor
  1968   – Lee Mack, English comedian, actor, producer, and screenwriter
1969 – Mark Bickley, Australian footballer and coach
  1969   – Max Cavalera, Brazilian singer-songwriter and guitarist 
  1969   – Troy O'Leary, American baseball player
1970 – John August, American director and screenwriter
  1970   – Bret Baier, American journalist
  1970   – Steve House, American mountaineer
  1970   – Steven Jack, South African cricketer
  1970   – Kate Silverton, English journalist
1971 – Bethan Benwell, English linguist, author, and academic
  1971   – Jeff Gordon, American race car driver and actor
1972 – Stefan Brogren, Canadian actor, director, producer, and screenwriter
1973 – Eva Amaral, Spanish singer-songwriter and guitarist 
  1973   – Xavier Marchand, French swimmer
  1973   – Marek Penksa, Slovak footballer
  1973   – Marcos Roberto Silveira Reis, Brazilian footballer
1974 – Kily González, Argentine footballer
1975 – Andy Hallett, American actor and singer (d. 2009)
  1975   – Nikos Liberopoulos, Greek footballer
  1975   – Jutta Urpilainen, Finnish politician, Deputy Prime Minister of Finland
  1975   – Daniella van Graas, Dutch model and actress
1976 – Paul Goldstein, American tennis player
  1976   – Andrew McLeod, Australian footballer
  1976   – Trevor Woodman, English rugby player and coach
1977 – Frankie Kazarian, American wrestler
  1977   – Luís Boa Morte, Portuguese footballer and manager
1978 – Jeremy Adduono, Canadian ice hockey player and coach
  1978   – Luke Allen, American baseball player (d. 2022)
  1978   – Kurt Busch, American race car driver
  1978   – Agnė Eggerth, Lithuanian sprinter
  1978   – Ibán Espadas, Spanish footballer
  1978   – Jon Knott, American baseball player 
  1978   – Karine Legault, Canadian swimmer
  1978   – Sandeep Naik, Indian politician
  1978   – Siri Nordby, Norwegian footballer
  1978   – Ricardo Serrano, Spanish cyclist
  1978   – Per-Åge Skrøder, Norwegian ice hockey player
  1978   – Satoshi Hino, Japanese voice actor
1979 – Robin Peterson, South African cricketer
1980 – Richard Dawson, English cricketer and coach
1981 – Marques Houston, American singer-songwriter, producer, and actor 
  1981   – Benjamin Lauth, German footballer
  1981   – Abigail Spencer, American actress
  1981   – Meghan, Duchess of Sussex, American actress and humanitarian, and member of British Royal Family
1983 – Greta Gerwig, American actress, producer, and screenwriter
1984 – Terry Campese, Australian rugby league player
  1984   – Mardy Collins, American basketball player
1985 – Crystal Bowersox, American singer-songwriter and guitarist
  1985   – Robbie Findley, American soccer player
  1985   – Mark Milligan, Australian footballer
  1985   – Ha Seung-jin, South Korean basketball player
  1985   – Antonio Valencia, Ecuadorean footballer
1986 – Nick Augusto, American drummer 
  1986   – Leon Camier, English motorcycle racer
  1986   – Cicinho, Brazilian footballer
  1986   – Iosia Soliola, New Zealand-Samoan rugby league player
  1986   – David Williams, Australian rugby league player
1987 – Jang Keun-suk, South Korean actor and singer
  1987   – Marreese Speights American basketball player
  1987   – Tomoya Warabino, Japanese actor
1988 – Carly Foulkes, Canadian model and actress
  1988   – Kelley O'Hara, American soccer player
1989 – Tomasz Kaczor, Polish sprint canoeist
  1989   – Jessica Mauboy, Australian singer-songwriter and actress
  1989   – Wang Hao, Chinese chess player
1990 – Hikmet Balioğlu, Turkish footballer
  1990   – Siim Tenno, Estonian footballer
1991 – Thiago Cardoso, Brazilian footballer
  1991   – Izet Hajrović, Bosnian footballer
1992 – Daniele Garozzo, Italian fencer
  1992   – Cole Sprouse, American actor
  1992   – Dylan Sprouse, American actor
1995 – Bruna Marquezine, Brazilian actress

Deaths

Pre-1600
 221 – Lady Zhen, Chinese empress (b. 183)
 966 – Berengar II of Italy (b. 900)
1060 – Henry I of France (b. 1008)
1113 – Gertrude of Saxony, countess and regent of Holland (b. c. 1030)
1265 – Peter de Montfort, English politician (b. 1215)
  1265   – Henry de Montfort (b. 1238)
  1265   – Simon de Montfort, 6th Earl of Leicester, French-English soldier and politician, Lord High Steward (b. 1208)
  1265   – Hugh le Despencer, 1st Baron le Despencer, English politician (b. 1223)
1266 – Eudes of Burgundy, Count of Nevers (b. 1230)
1306 – Wenceslaus III of Bohemia (b. 1289)
1345 – As-Salih Ismail, Sultan of Egypt (b. 1326)
1378 – Galeazzo II Visconti, Lord of Milan (b. c. 1320)
1430 – Philip I, Duke of Brabant (b. 1404)
1526 – Juan Sebastián Elcano, Spanish explorer and navigator (b. 1476)
1578 – Sebastian of Portugal (b. 1554)
1598 – William Cecil, 1st Baron Burghley, English academic and politician, Lord High Treasurer (b. 1520)

1601–1900
1612 – Hugh Broughton, English scholar and theologian (b. 1549)
1639 – Juan Ruiz de Alarcón, Mexican actor and playwright (b. 1581)
1718 – René Lepage de Sainte-Claire, French-Canadian founder of Rimouski (b. 1656)
1727 – Victor-Maurice, comte de Broglie, French general (b. 1647)
1741 – Andrew Hamilton, Scottish-American lawyer and politician (b. 1676)
1778 – Pierre de Rigaud, Marquis de Vaudreuil-Cavagnial, Canadian-French politician, Governor General of New France (b. 1698)
1792 – John Burgoyne, English general and politician (b. 1723)
1795 – Timothy Ruggles, American lawyer, jurist, and politician (b. 1711)
1804 – Adam Duncan, 1st Viscount Duncan, Scottish admiral (b. 1731)
1822 – Kristjan Jaak Peterson, Estonian poet and author (b. 1801)
1844 – Jacob Aall, Norwegian economist, historian, and politician (b. 1773)
1859 – John Vianney, French priest and saint (b. 1786)
1873 – Viktor Hartmann, Russian architect and painter (b. 1834)
1875 – Hans Christian Andersen, Danish novelist, short story writer, and poet (b. 1805)
1886 – Samuel J. Tilden, American lawyer and politician, 25th Governor of New York (b. 1814)
1900 – Isaac Levitan, Russian painter and educator (b. 1860)

1901–present
1914 – Jules Lemaître, French playwright and critic (b. 1853)
1919 – Dave Gregory, Australian cricketer and umpire (b. 1845)
1922 – Enver Pasha, Ottoman general and politician (b. 1881)
1932 – Alfred Henry Maurer, American painter (b. 1868)
1938 – Pearl White, American actress (b. 1889)
1940 – Ze'ev Jabotinsky, Ukrainian-American general, journalist, and activist (b. 1880)
1941 – Mihály Babits, Hungarian poet and author (b. 1883)
1942 – Alberto Franchetti, Italian composer and educator (b. 1860)
1944 – Krzysztof Kamil Baczyński, Polish soldier and poet (b. 1921)
1957 – John Cain Sr., Australian politician, 34th Premier of Victoria (b. 1882)
  1957   – Washington Luís, Brazilian lawyer and politician, 13th President of Brazil (b. 1869)
1958 – Ethel Anderson, Australian poet, author, and painter (b. 1883)
1959 – József Révai, Hungarian politician, Hungarian Minister of Education (b. 1898)
1961 – Margarito Bautista, Nahua-Mexican evangelizer, theologian, and religious founder (b. 1878)
1962 – Marilyn Monroe, American model and actress (b. 1926)
1964 – Nätti-Jussi, Finnish lumberjack and forest laborer (b. 1890)
1967 – Peter Smith, English cricketer (b. 1908)
1976 – Enrique Angelelli, Argentinian bishop and martyr (b. 1923)
  1976   – Roy Thomson, 1st Baron Thomson of Fleet, Canadian-English publisher (b. 1894)
1977 – Edgar Adrian, 1st Baron Adrian, English physiologist and academic, Nobel Prize laureate (b. 1889)
1981 – Melvyn Douglas, American actor (b. 1901)
1982 – Bruce Goff, American architect, designed the Boston Avenue Methodist Church (b. 1904)
1985 – Don Whillans, English rock climber and mountaineer (b. 1933)
1990 – Ettore Maserati, Italian engineer and businessman (b. 1894)
1992 – Seichō Matsumoto, Japanese author (b. 1909)
1996 – Geoff Hamilton, English gardener, author, and television host (b. 1936)
1997 – Jeanne Calment, French super-centenarian; holds records for the world's substantiated longest-lived person (b. 1875)
1998 – Yury Artyukhin, Russian colonel, engineer, and astronaut (b. 1930)
1999 – Victor Mature, American actor (b. 1913)
2003 – Frederick Chapman Robbins, American pediatrician and virologist, Nobel Prize laureate (b. 1916)
2004 – Mary Sherman Morgan, American chemist and engineer (b. 1921)
  2004   – Hossein Panahi (Persian: حسین پناهی), Iranian actor and poet (b. 1956)
2005 – Anatoly Larkin, Russian-American physicist and theorist (b. 1932)
  2005   – Iván Szabó, Hungarian economist and politician, Minister of Finance of Hungary (b. 1934)
2007 – Lee Hazlewood, American singer-songwriter and producer (b. 1929)
  2007   – Raul Hilberg, Austrian-American political scientist and historian (b. 1926)
2008 – Craig Jones, English motorcycle racer (b. 1985)
2009 – Blake Snyder, American screenwriter and producer (b. 1957)
2011 – Naoki Matsuda, Japanese footballer (b. 1977)
2012 – Johnnie Bassett, American singer-songwriter and guitarist (b. 1935)
  2012   – Brian Crozier, Australian-English journalist and historian (b. 1918)
  2012   – Bud Riley, American football player and coach (b. 1925)
2013 – Keith H. Basso, American anthropologist and academic (b. 1940)
  2013   – Art Donovan, American football player and radio host (b. 1925)
  2013   – Olavi J. Mattila, Finnish engineer and politician, Finnish Minister of Foreign Affairs (b. 1918)
  2013   – Renato Ruggiero, Italian lawyer and politician, Italian Minister of Foreign Affairs (b. 1930)
  2013   – Tony Snell, English lieutenant and pilot (b. 1922)
  2013   – Sandy Woodward, English admiral (b. 1932)
2014 – James Brady, American activist and politician, 15th White House Press Secretary (b. 1940)
  2014   – Chester Crandell, American lawyer and politician (b. 1946)
  2014   – Jake Hooker, Israeli-American guitarist and songwriter (b. 1953)
2015 – Elsie Hillman, American philanthropist and politician (b. 1925)
  2015   – Les Munro, New Zealand soldier and pilot (b. 1919)
  2015   – John Rudometkin, American basketball player (b. 1940)
  2015   – Billy Sherrill, American songwriter and producer (b. 1936)
2019 – Nuon Chea, Cambodian politician and theorist for the Khmer Rouge (b. 1926)

Holidays and observances
 Christian feast day:
 Aristarchus
 Euphronius
 Blessed Frédéric Janssoone
 John Vianney
 Molua (or Lua)
 Raynerius of Split
 Sithney, patron saint of mad dogs
 August 4 (Eastern Orthodox liturgics)
 Coast Guard Day (United States)
 Constitution Day (Cook Islands); first Monday in August
 Matica slovenská Day (Slovakia)
 Barack Obama Day in Illinois in the United States
2020 Beirut explosion commemoration day in Lebanon

References

External links

 
 
 

Days of the year
August